Sanaba is a town in the Boucle du Mouhoun Region of Burkina Faso. It is the capital of Sanaba Department. 

Populated places in the Boucle du Mouhoun Region
Banwa Province